Hydrogenophaga pseudoflava is a bacterium from the Comamonadaceae family.

References

External links
Type strain of Hydrogenophaga pseudoflava at BacDive -  the Bacterial Diversity Metadatabase

Comamonadaceae
Bacteria described in 1989